NZNOG is the New Zealand Network Operators' Group. Originally formed as a mailing list hosted by the University of Waikato and intended to provide a means of easy collaboration between Internet service provider network operations staff, its role has expanded to that of an online community of network operators, predominantly in the ISP space, allowing for the discussion of topics of a technical and operational nature. NZNOG has existed as a legal entity in the form of the NZNOG Trust since 2009.

NZNOG runs a yearly conference, during which workshops, tutorials and presentations on various topics of interest to the network operations community in New Zealand. It also provides an excellent opportunity to network with others in the industry - there is usually at least one evening which provides a catered dinner, as well as opportunity for BoF's.

The ongoing success of the NZNOG Conference owes much to the enthusiastic support of its participants, being key staff of various New Zealand Internet service providers, IT companies and tertiary education institutions.

As an example of the role NZNOG has had in the Internet world in New Zealand, it played a major part in the formation of the first of the vendor-neutral Peering Exchanges in New Zealand - such as the Wellington Internet Exchange (WIX) and the Auckland Peering Exchange (APE).

The NZNOG mailing list remains a fairly influential aspect of the New Zealand Internet service provider community, and a useful communications channel for the participants.

Conferences
 2002 - Auckland at Airport Sheraton - Joint Conference with UniforumNZ
 2003 - Auckland at Waipuna Lodge - Joint Conference with UniforumNZ
 2004 - Hamilton at University of Waikato
 2005 - Hamilton at University of Waikato
 2006 - Wellington at Victoria University of Wellington
 2007 - Palmerston North at Massey University. Hosted by InspireNet
 2008 - Dunedin at Otago Museum. Hosted by WIC
 2009 - Auckland at Mount Richmond Hotel and Conference Centre. Hosted by FX Networks
 2010 - Hamilton at University of Waikato. Hosted by WAND and Rurallink
 2011 - Wellington at InterContinental Hotel. Hosted by Vodafone
 2012 - Christchurch at Copthorne Commodore Hotel.
 2013 - Wellington at Mercure Hotel.
 2014 - Nelson at Rutherford Hotel.
 2015 - Rotorua at Distinction Hotel.
 2016 - No Conference due to APRICOT (conference) in Auckland
 2017 - Tauranga at Trinity Wharf
 2018 - Queenstown at Rydges Hotel
 2019 - Napier Conference Centre
 2020 - Christchurch at Rydges Latimer
 2021 - No Conference due to the COVID-19 pandemic
 2022 - Wellington at InterContinental Hotel. Conference postponed to May due to restrictions under the COVID-19 Protection Framework.
 2023 - Rotorua announced for the Rydges Hotel in late March.

See also
 Internet network operators' group

External links & References
NZNOG Conference & Official website
NZNOG Mailing List
Announcement regarding the formation of the NZNOG Trust
NZ Societies and Trusts record for NZNOG Trust
NZ Internet Exchange website

Internet Network Operators' Groups
Business organisations based in New Zealand
Internet in New Zealand
Electronic mailing lists